Çisti Klyuç (also, Chistyy Klyuch) is a village in the Khizi Rayon of Azerbaijan.  The village forms part of the municipality of Altıağac.

References 

 

Populated places in Khizi District